Before the Trap: Nights in Tarzana is the seventh mixtape by American recording artist Chris Brown, and it's a collaborative mixtape with his OHB group. It was released on April 29, 2016 on DatPiff for free. 

The mixtape was done during the first months of 2016, but it also contains few songs that were recorded prior to its actual making. It features appearances from rappers of Brown's OHB collective and others, including Hoody Baby, Young Blacc, Young Lo, Dee Cosey, Kevin Gates, Tyga, Section Boyz, Quavo, Gangsta Robb, Keeis Stackz, Tracy T, Ryan Toby, Lyrica Anderson, Young Thug, Young Jeezy. The mixtape contains productions from different producers, including Prince Chrishan, D. A. Doman, A1, Drumma Boy, Foreign Teck and others 

The mixtape was re-released as a commercial mixtape exclusively on the streaming platforms Tidal and Amazon Music on July 2, 2018, with a different tracklist, adding to it numerous songs from the collaborative mixtape Attack the Block by Brown, OHB and Section Boyz also released in 2016.

Background 
Brown and most of the guys that afterwards would've formed the collective, have been knowing each other since the singer's childhood, with some of them being his cousins. Their first public appearance all together was in Brown's 2011 music video for his song "Strip". They later started to hang around together more often the following 2 years, officially claiming to be the crew named OHB since 2012. That same year they briefly started to make music, mainly over Drumma Boy productions, but nothing came out of it officially. In 2013 Brown appeared in two tracks of Kid Red's mixtape REDemption, marking the first official collaboration between him and an OHB artist. In late 2013 Brown voluntarily decided to enter rehab, and later ended up in jail for violating his probation. He was released from jail on June 2, 2014. After he got out of jail he distanced himself from the crew, explaining, during a 2014 interview for radio Hot 97, that he took that decision because he wanted to quit the "thug" and "turned up" lifestyle that he was living the previous couple of years with his crew, that included the usage of drugs like xanax and lean, because he noticed that it started to affect negatively his attitude, as well as his working. He also said that he distanced himself also because, considering that he was still in probation, it wasn't a "conducive" choice to associate himself with that.

However, he reunited with the crew before the summer of 2015, after beaking up with his ex-girlfriend Karrueche Tran and ending his probation. By the end of the year the OHB crew was spending several days at Brown's house with him, and they were more constantly working on their music individually. During the first months of 2016 Brown was more frequently seen with his crew, regularly spending the nights partying with them, then doing after parties at his house located in Tarzana, Los Angeles. During this last period they decided to work all together on their first official mixtape entitled Before the Trap: Nights in Tarzana.

Recording 
The making of the mixtape took place for the most part during the first months of 2016, while few tracks off of it were recorded before its actual making, like the track "Side Piece", that was done in June 2015 during the making of Brown's seventh studio album Royalty, or like Young Lo's track "Like I Done It Before" that was made in December 2015, while the Drumma Boy-produced songs "Big Dreams" and "Roller Coaster" were recorded  way prior, in 2012.

Composition 
Musically, the 19-track tape sound has been described mainly as a darker trap sound, with poppy, DJ Mustard-esque songs to some mid-tempo R&B songs that fill the in-between, with Chris Brown performances that vary from his rapping to his singing.

The lyrics of the mixtape, for the vast majority, describe a reckless lifestyle full of drugs, sexual encounters with numerous untrustworthy easy women, also illustrating a dangerous street life filled with guns, dirty money and luxurious cars.

Release and promotion 
On April 21, 2016 Brown officially announced the mixtape, after sharing some snippets of it during the previous weeks, by posting the track "Shut Down" on his SoundCloud page, also writing on his Twitter account the hashtags #OHBMixtape, #BeforeTheTrap, and #NightsInTarzana. The mixtape release date was announced on April 27 by Brown on Twitter, simultaneously announcing the European leg of his One Hell of a Nite Tour, the documentary Welcome to My Life, and the publication of his single "Grass Ain't Greener". After its dropping, some songs from the mixtape were performed by the artists on Brown's European leg of his One Hell of a Nite Tour

The mixtape was re-released as a commercial mixtape exclusively on the streaming platforms Tidal and Amazon Music on July 2, 2018, with a different tracklist, excluding the songs "TrapHouse Blues", "Like I Done It Before" and "Rumorz", adding to it numerous songs from the collaborative mixtape Attack the Block by Brown, OHB and Section Boyz also released in 2016.

Commercial performance 
The mixtape on DatPiff was certified platinum by the site's standars, reaching over 300,000 downloads and over 1,600,000 full listens.

Track listing

Sample credits
"Love Gon Go" contains a sample from "Lose Control" performed by Silk
"Rumorz" interpolates "Rumors" performed by Timex Social Club

References

Chris Brown albums
2016 mixtape albums